Every year, the Korean Basketball League (KBL) awards titles to various leaders in the five basketball statistical categories—points, rebounds, assists, steals, and blocked shots. It subdivides the categories for scoring and rebounding into "overall", which includes both domestic and foreign players, and "domestic".

Previously an award was given to the domestic players who ranked first in the scoring and rebounding categories but was scrapped after the 2003–04 season. The KBL continues to publish the statistics on its website.

List of statistics leaders

170 Club and 180 Club
In the KBL, both terms are used to describe players as excellent shooters, similar to the "50–40–90 club" used in the NBA. The "170 Club" requires a player to achieve the criteria of 50% field goal percentage, 40% three-point field goal percentage and 80% free throw percentage over the course of a regular season, while meeting the minimum thresholds to qualify as a league leader in each category.

To be described as part of the "180 Club", a player's free throw percentage must be at least 90%. In the history of the KBL, only two players have made the "180 Club", Choo Seung-gyun and Cho Sung-min. Cho was only 0.58% away from setting a new record, the "190 Club".

Notes

References

External links
선수 순위 (Player statistics ranking) – Korean Basketball League official website 

Korean Basketball League
Basketball statistics